A dilemma action is a type of non-violent civil disobedience designed to create a "response dilemma" or "lose-lose" situation for public authorities "by forcing them to either concede some public space to protesters or make themselves look absurd or heavy-handed by acting against the protest." The Serbian-based NGO Centre for Applied Nonviolent Action and Strategies has extensively used the technique in its trainings to nonviolent civil resistors. 

Examples of dilemma actions include Ai Weiwei's gathering to eat pig's trotters, the Standing protests of the 2013 protests in Turkey, the Gaza Freedom Flotilla and Uganda's 2011 Walk to Work protests.

See also 
 Dilemma (confrontation analysis)

Further reading
 George Lakey, Powerful Peacemaking: A Strategy for a Living Revolution (Philadelphia, PA: New Society Publishers, 1987 [1973]). 
 Srdja Popovic, Andrej Milovojevic, and Slobodan Djinovic, Nonviolent Struggle: 50 Crucial Points, 2d ed. (Belgrade: Center for Applied Non Violent Action and Strategies, 2007), 70–71.
 Philippe Duhamel, The Dilemma Demonstration: Using Nonviolent Civil Disobedience to Put the Government between a Rock and a Hard Place (Minneapolis, MN: Center for Victims of Torture, 2004).

References

Civil disobedience